This is a list of English composers of the Renaissance period in alphabetical order.

Richard Alison (c. 1560/1570–before 1610)
John Amner (1579–1641)
Hugh Aston (c. 1485–1558)
Thomas Ashwell (c. 1478–after 1513)
John Benet (fl. 1420–1450)
John Bennet (c. 1575–after 1614)
William Brade (1560–1630)
John Browne (fl. c. 1490)
John Bull (1562–1628)
William Byrd (c. 1540–1623)
Thomas Campion (1567–1620)

J. Cooke, probably John Cooke (fl. 1417)
John Cooper (c. 1570–1626)
William Cornysh (1465–1523)
Francis Cutting (1583–1603)
John Danyel (c. 1564–c. 1626)
John Dowland (1563–1626)
John Dunstaple (c. 1390–1453)
Michael East (c. 1580–1648)
Giles Farnaby (c. 1563–1640)
Robert Fayrfax (1464–1521)
Alfonso Ferrabosco the elder (1543–1588)
Alfonso Ferrabosco the younger (c. 1575–1628)
Thomas Ford (c. 1580–1648)
Walter Frye (died c. 1475)
Ellis Gibbons (1573–1603)
Orlando Gibbons (1583–1625)
Anthony Holborne (c. 1545–1602)
John Hothby (c. 1410–1487)
Richard Hygons (c. 1435–c. 1509)
John Jenkins (1592–1678)
Robert Johnson (c. 1583–c. 1634)
John Johnson (c. 1545–1594)
Hugh Kellyk (fl. c. 1480)
Robert Jones (c. 1577–after 1615)
Walter Lambe (c. 1450–c. 1504)
Nicholas Ludford (c. 1485–c. 1557)
Thomas Lupo (1571–1627)
John Maynard (c. 1577–c. 1633)
John Merbecke (c. 1505- c.1585)
Thomas Morley (c. 1558–1602)
William Mundy (c. 1529–c. 1591)
Richard Nicholson or Nicolson (died 1639)
Osbert Parsley (15111585)
Robert Parsons (c. 1535–1572)
William Parsons (fl. 1545–1563)
Peter Philips (c. 1560–1628)
Leonel Power (c. 1370/1385–1445)
Thomas Preston (died c. 1563)
John Plummer (c. 1410–c. 1483)
Thomas Ravenscroft (c. 1582/1592–1635)
Thomas Robinson (c. 1560–1610)
Philip Rosseter (c. 1568–1623)
John Sheppard (c. 1515–1558)
Thomas Simpson (1582–c. 1628)
Robert Stone (1516–1613)
John Sutton (fl. late 15th c.)
Thomas Tallis (c. 1505–1585)
John Taverner (c. 1490–1545)
William Tisdale (born c. 1570)
Thomas Tomkins (1572–1656)
Edmund Turges may be same as Edmund Sturges (fl. c. 1507)
Christopher Tye (c. 1505–before 1573)
John Ward (1571–1638)
Thomas Weelkes (1576–1623)
Robert White (c. 1538–1574)
John Wilbye (1574–1638)

See also
 Early music of the British Isles
 List of Renaissance composers
 Chronological list of English classical composers
 List of English Baroque composers

References
 The Columbia Electronic Encyclopedia, 6th ed. Copyright © 2007, Columbia University Press.
AllMusic
gramophone.co.uk

English
Renaissance